The Lincoln Navicross is a concept car that was built by Lincoln. The Lincoln Navicross was first unveiled at the 2003 Detroit Auto Show.

The vehicle features styling similar to that of the Zephyr and MK9 concept car. Two chrome accent bars placed on the vehicle's left and right front fenders run the full length of the vehicle as in the MK9 and Mark X concepts. The vehicles features Lincoln's hallmark waterfall grille with the Lincoln emblem at its center. Much like the MKS concept models presented at the 2006 Detroit Auto Show, the Navicross features suicide doors which according to Ford, give "unrestricted ingress and egress to the luxurious interior." Suicide doors also appeared in the Continental concept car and the MKS concept car.

The interior itself featured power adjustable, climate controlled leather seats along with a "symmetrical" dashboard that like other Lincoln concept models and the Zephyr production model featured both metal as well as more tradition wood grain trim.

The Navicross concept was 186.6" (4740 mm) long and featured 20" alloy wheels along with a supercharged 4.2 L V8. Permanent all wheel drive and Hill Descent Control (HDC) were among the technical highlights of the concept vehicle.

External links
 The Crisp, Edgy Lincoln Navicross Concept

Navicross
Cars introduced in 2003
All-wheel-drive vehicles
Mid-size cars
Luxury vehicles
Sedans